The 1918–19 Yorkshire Cup was the eleventh occasion on which the Yorkshire Cup competition had been held. This quickly arranged competition was won by the cup holder who would make it a hat trick of wins, taking up where they left off before the start of the  World War.  Huddersfield beat Dewsbury by the score of 14-8 in the final. The match was played at Headingley, Leeds, now in West Yorkshire. The attendance was 21,500 and receipts were £1,309.

The shortened 1918–19 (February–May) season began less than three months after the end of the hostilities and the armistice of Compiègne. The country was still suffering from the aftermath of the long and bitter struggle. The 1918–19 (January) Northern Rugby Football Union Wartime Emergency League season had been operating since September 1918. This was cancelled, and the programme started tailing off in January 1919. The only club to be "lost" to the Yorkshire League was Keighley who closed down for the duration of the War and did not recommence playing until the start of the  1919-20 season. This season saw an invitation to junior/amateur club Featherstone Rovers which, with the  temporary loss of Keighley, resulted in the  total entries remaining the same as in the previous competition held before the outbreak of the war at thirteen. This in turn resulted in three byes in the first round.

This was Huddersfield's sixth appearance in what would be seven appearances in eight consecutive finals between 1909 and 1919 (which included four successive victories and six in total), and who knows, but for the intervention of the First World War and suspension of the competition, it may have been more. It was also the third of the four consecutive wins.

Background 

The Rugby Football League's Yorkshire Cup competition was a knock-out competition between (mainly professional) rugby league clubs from  the  county of Yorkshire. The actual area was at times increased to encompass other teams from  outside the  county such as Newcastle, Mansfield, Coventry, and even London (in the form of Acton & Willesden. The competition always took place early in the season, in the Autumn, with the final taking place in (or just before) December (The only exception to this was when disruption of the fixture list was caused during, and immediately after, the two World Wars).

Competition and Results

Round 1 
Involved  5 matches (with three byes) and 13 clubs

Round 2 – quarterfinals 
Involved 4 matches and 8 clubs

Round 3 – semifinals  
Involved 2 matches and 4 clubs

Final

Teams and scorers 

Scoring - Try = three (3) points - Goal = two (2) points - Drop goal = two (2) points

The road to success

Notes 
1 * Bramley entered the  Yorkshire Cup competition in the  inaugural year of 1905, and have competed in each tournament since, but this was the first cup match won by them.

2 * Featherstone Rovers were at the time a junior/amateur club. They eventually joined the League for season 1921-22

3 * Headingley, Leeds, is the home ground of Leeds RLFC with a capacity of 21,000. The record attendance was  40,175 for a league match between Leeds and Bradford Northern on 21 May 1947.

See also 
1918–19 Northern Rugby Football Union season
Rugby league county cups

References

External links
Saints Heritage Society
1896–97 Northern Rugby Football Union season at wigan.rlfans.com
Hull&Proud Fixtures & Results 1896/1897
Widnes Vikings - One team, one passion Season In Review - 1896-97
The Northern Union at warringtonwolves.org

1919 1
Yorkshire Cup 1